A list of bridges in Maribor, Slovenia:

D 
 Double-Storey Bridge

K 
 Carinthian Bridge

M 
 Malečnik Bridge

S 
 Slomšek Bridge
 Studenci Footbridge
 Old Bridge

T 
 Tito Bridge

Ž 
 Railway Bridge

Maribor
Bridges, Maribor
Bridges, Maribor